The Commonwealth Arena and Sir Chris Hoy Velodrome, known for sponsorship reasons as the Emirates Arena, is an indoor arena and velodrome in Dalmarnock, Glasgow, Scotland. Built for the 2014 Commonwealth Games, these venues hosted the badminton and track cycling events. Situated opposite Celtic Park in the East End of Glasgow, the complex is the headquarters of Sportscotland and Scottish Cycling.

History
It was built on a  site at a cost of £113 million. The construction work took place between 2009 and 2012. The venue opened in October 2012.

In September 2017, neighbours Celtic F.C. had plans approved for the construction of a hotel complex within their land, situated directly across the road from the arena and velodrome.

Indoor arena 

The Indoor Arena has a capacity of 6,500 and during the Commonwealth Games it had twelve badminton courts in three indoor sports halls. The arena has a hydraulically lifted 200m indoor running track that hosted the Aviva International Match, which will move from Kelvin Hall.

At the start of the 2012–13 British Basketball League season the Glasgow Rocks moved from the Kelvin Hall to the new arena. With their opening game against traditional arch-rivals Newcastle Eagles selling out. With 1,500 extra floor seats around the arena's running track, it became the largest arena of any club in the British Basketball League at the time, and on 8 November 2012 it was announced by the League that the arena would become the venue for the final of the BBL Trophy.

In 2015 the Great Britain Davis Cup team played the United States in the first round and Australia in the Semi-final at the 2015 Davis Cup, featuring top British player and world number three Andy Murray. The arena capacity was expanded to 8,200 for the semi-final to comply with requirements for the Davis Cup. Great Britain played again at the arena for the 2016 Davis Cup semifinals.

The arena was the main venue for the 2019 European Athletics Indoor Championships.

Velodrome 
 
The Velodrome has a 250-meter indoor track with a capacity of 2,500 (2,000 seated), expanding to 4,500 (4,000 seated) with temporary seating during the Games. The Velodrome is named after Olympic and Commonwealth gold-medal winning Scottish cyclist Sir Chris Hoy, who was, at the time, Britain's most successful Olympic athlete.

It opened in October 2012, and hosted a round of the 2012–13 UCI Track Cycling World Cup series In August 2013, it hosted the 2013 UCI Juniors Track World Championships. It was the venue for the 2014 Commonwealth Games. The velodrome hosted the European Track Cycling Championships, which was part of the first European Sports Championships.

The arena has parking for 416 cars and 26 disabled bays. Overflow parking is available at Celtic Park.

References

External links 

Official website
Commonwealth Games page
Fly-through video

Cycle racing in Scotland
Sports venues in Glasgow
Velodromes in Scotland
Indoor arenas in Scotland
Parkhead
Bridgeton–Calton–Dalmarnock
2014 Commonwealth Games venues
Sports venues completed in 2012
2012 establishments in Scotland
Basketball venues in Scotland
Badminton venues
Badminton in Scotland
2018 European Championships venues
2017 BWF World Championships
Glasgow Rocks
2015 Davis Cup
2016 Davis Cup
2019 European Athletics Indoor Championships
2018 UEC European Track Championships
Netball venues in Scotland